From the Life of Fyodor Kuzkin is a 1989 Soviet drama film directed by Stanislav Rostotsky.

Plot 
The film tells about the man Fyodor Kuzkin, who went through all the bad weather of the thirties and forties and decided to become the sole person.

Cast 
 Aleksandr Susnin as Fyodor Kuzkin
 Tatyana Bedova as Avdotya
 Sergey Bystritskiy	
 Denis Borisov
 Mikhail Zhigalov
 Anatoli Borodin
 Pyotr Shcherbakov		
 Mikhail Kokshenov
 Pavel Vinnik
 Nikolay Pogodin
 Pyotr Lyubeshkin

References

External links 
 

1989 films
1980s Russian-language films
Soviet drama films
1989 drama films